Hermeuptychia pimpla is a species of butterfly in the family Nymphalidae. It was described by Baron Cajetan von Felder and his son Rudolf Felder in 1862. It is found in Peru.

References

Butterflies described in 1862
Euptychiina